Macquet is a surname. Notable people with the surname include:

Jean-Baptiste Macquet (born 1983), French rower
Laurent Macquet (born 1979), French footballer
Michel Macquet (1932–2002), French athlete
Phil. Macquet (born 1967), French painter

Surnames of French origin
fr:Macquet